János Lázár (born 19 February 1975) is a Hungarian politician and Member of Parliament. He was former leader of the Fidesz parliamentary group (2010–2012) and State Secretary, then Minister of Prime Minister's Office (2012–2018) in the cabinets of Viktor Orbán. In this capacity, he was regarded as de facto the second most powerful member of the cabinet, but lost political influence by 2018. He also served as Mayor of Hódmezővásárhely from 2002 to 2012.

Career 
He started his career as a law apprentice at city council of Hódmezővásárhely at 1995. He was personal secretary at the Hungarian Parliament at 1999. He joined Fidesz in 2000. He became both a Parliament representative and mayor of Hódmezővásárhely at 2002, following the death of his mentor András Rapcsák. In 2002, he became a member of the Christian Democratic People's Party (KDNP) too.

He became leader of the Fidesz parliamentary group after the 2010 election, succeeding Tibor Navracsics in this position.

Lázár was appointed Secretary of State of Prime Minister's Office on 2 June 2012, as a result he resigned from the office of mayor of Hódmezővásárhely. He was replaced by Antal Rogán as head of the Fidesz parliamentary group on that day. Lázár was elected one of the four vice-presidents of Fidesz in September 2013, replacing Mihály Varga. He held that party office until December 2015. Lázár was promoted to Minister of the Prime Minister's Office following the 2014 parliamentary election an held this office until 2018. On 27 July 2020 he was elected President of the Hungarian Tennis Association.

Controversy

On 18 November 2010 János Lázár criticized strongly the former President of the Constitutional Court of Hungary, László Sólyom in an interview published in Népszabadság.

In March 2011 In the recording posted on the Internet, Lázár as mayor of Hódmezővásárhely could be heard telling the city council in 2008 that "those people who have nothing are worth just that". Addressing a press conference, Lázár said, '"I would like to apologise to Hungary for my ambiguous and misunderstood statement. I would like to apologise to all who feel hurt by that".

He said that his remark had not referred to the poor but to those who were unsuccessful in their profession but embarked on a political career merely with the purpose of making a livelihood and for financial gains. Lázár also said the remarks were parts of a longer speech and out of their original context. The three opposition parties slammed the senior Fidesz official for his remarks. Lázár sued the journals, which had claimed that he used these words in connection with the poor. The verdict of the Court of the city of Eger found that Lázár was right, and the record was manipulated.

On 12 May 2014, Hungarian news website Origo published an article about his travels on the Hungarian government's budget, which led Lázár to pay back 2 million forints to the state budget. On 2 June, the lead editor of the website was fired, allegedly under pressure from Lázár, who denied being involved in the decision.

Personal life
He is married. His wife is Dr Zita Lázárné Megyeri. They have two sons, János Boldizsár and Zsigmond Bertalan.

References

External links
 hvg.hu, 4 May 2007, Interview with Janos Lazar
Fellibben a fátyol Lázár János titkos küldetéseiről, Origo, 2014. május 12.

1975 births
Living people
Mayors of places in Hungary
Fidesz politicians
Members of the National Assembly of Hungary (2002–2006)
Members of the National Assembly of Hungary (2006–2010)
Members of the National Assembly of Hungary (2010–2014)
Members of the National Assembly of Hungary (2014–2018)
Members of the National Assembly of Hungary (2018–2022)
Members of the National Assembly of Hungary (2022–2026)
People from Hódmezővásárhely
Members of the fifth Orbán government